SMBC Nikko Securities (SMBC日興証券株式会社) is a securities firm in Japan which engages in the operation of large-scale comprehensive securities broking and trading services. The company was founded in 2009 and is headquartered in Tokyo, Japan. It is a wholly owned subsidiary of the Sumitomo Mitsui Financial Group. In Japan, its the third largest securities brokerage firm.

History

The origins of SMBC Nikko Securities can be traced back to a company named Kawashimaya Shoten (川島屋商店) which was formed in July 1918 by Genichi Toyama. It was formed to buy and sell stocks and bonds. 

In 1920, the firm was incorporated into a stock company.  

During the same year, Nikko Securities was created out of the securities department of the Industrial Bank of Japan.

In 1939, Kawashimaya Shoten spun off its securities division forming Kawashimaya Securities. In 1943, Kawashimaya Securities absorbed Kawashimaya Shoten.

In 1944, Kawashimaya Securities and Nikko Securities merged with the resulting company continuing to use the Nikko Securities trade name.

In 2001, the firm changed its name from Nikko Securities to Nikko Cordial Securities.

In 2007, the firm became a subsidiary of Citigroup after Citigroup purchased Nikko Cordial Corporation forming Nikko Citi Holdings Inc.

On June 15, 2009, Nikko Cordial Securities De-merger Preparatory Company Ltd was formed. This is considered the legal entity of the firm up to present.In October 2009, Nikko Cordial Securities De-merger Preparatory Company Ltd took over all of the operations of the original Nikko Cordial Securities business and certain businesses of Nikko Citigroup. It was then renamed Nikko Cordial Securities. Then Citigroup sold the firm to the Sumitomo Mitsui Banking Corporation.

In 2011, the firm changed its name from Nikko Cordial Securities to SMBC Nikko Securities.

In 2016, the firm became a wholly owned direct subsidiary of Sumitomo Mitsui Financial Group.

In 2018, the firm merged with SMBC Friend Securities while continuing to use the SMBC Nikko Securities trade name.

Controversies

2012 Insider Trading Fine 
In April 2012, the Financial Services Agency fined the firm for leaking information about a stock offering which was considered insider trading. Directors of the firm passed on word of the offering to at least 21 sales branches without carrying out the proper internal procedures to control the information flow. At eight of those branches a total of 23 sales staff tipped off 34 clients to purchase the shares once the deal was launched. The deal was said to be a roughly 1 trillion yen ($12.4 billion) offering by Sumitomo Mitsui Financial Group, Nikko’s parent, in early 2010.

2021-2022 Investigation into Market Manipulation 
In November 2021, the Securities and Exchange Surveillance Commission (SESC) launched an investigation into the firm over suspicious stock transactions. The firm was suspected of using its proprietary trading desk to illegitimately maintain the price of stocks in block trades. The firm launched a complaint with financial regulators after a senior trader died following intensive questioning.

On March 4, 2022, four  employees of the firm were arrested on allegations of market manipulation. The employees were Trevor Hill (Head of equity), Alexandre Avakiants (Deputy head of equity), Makoto Yamada (General manager of equity trading) and Shinichiro Okazaki (General manager of structured products). The firm's President & CEO, Yuichiro Kondo issued a public apology afterwards.

On March 23, 2022, SESC has called on prosecutors to extend allegations against the firm. If prosecutors accept the additional charges, three more staff from the firm could be indicted.

References

External links
 Official site

Sumitomo Mitsui Financial Group
Financial services companies based in Tokyo
Financial services companies established in 2009
Financial services companies of Japan
2009 establishments in Japan
2016 mergers and acquisitions